The Lok Sabha (meaning "House of the People") is the lower house of the Parliament of India. Uttarakhand state elects five members and they are directly elected by the state electorates of Uttarakhand. Members are elected for five years with first-past-the-post voting. The number of seats, allocated to the state/union territory are determined by the population of the state/union territory.

Current members
Keys:

 Source: Parliament of India (Lok Sabha)

List of all Lok Sabha members from Uttarakhand
This is the list of all Lok Sabha members from Uttarakhand in chronological order.

Keys:

Source: Parliament of India (Rajya Sabha)

See also
 List of Rajya Sabha members from Uttarakhand
 List of parliamentary constituencies in Uttarakhand

References

Uttarakhand-related lists
Uttarakhand
 
Lists of people from Uttarakhand